The XVI Bolivarian Games (Spanish: Juegos Bolivarianos) were a multi-sport event held in 2009 in Sucre, Bolivia. The competitions in Sucre took place from 15–26 November. A number of Bolivian cities hosted some of the sporting events, including Cochabamba, Santa Cruz and Tarija. Also, events were held outside of Bolivia, with Guayaquil, Lima, Quito and  Salinas hosting a number of competitions. The Games were organized by the Bolivarian Sports Organization (ODEBO).

The opening ceremony took place on November 14, 2009, at the Estadio Patria in Sucre, Bolivia.  The Games were officially opened by Bolivian president Evo Morales.  Torch lighter was swimmer Héctor Medina.  The athlete's oath was sworn by sprinter Lupita Rojas.

Deficits in Organization and Criticism 
A number of organizational deficits was reported.  Initially, the games were scheduled between September 12–24, 2009.  On July 1, 2009, the games were postponed to the new date because of "technical problems".  The construction works on the sports facilities did not proceed fast enough.  The infrastructure was not yet finished even when the games were already officially opened.  Some sports like cycling and baseball had to be relocated to secondary venues like Cochabamba at short notice.  Other sports like athletics, billiards, fencing, table tennis, taekwondo, or volleyball were experiencing problems because of the lack of equipment.  Some sports like roller sports were cancelled completely.  Weightlifting competitions had to start already on October 30, 2009, because the world championships would have been contemporaneously else.  In equestrianism, the transfer of the horses to Bolivia could not be guaranteed.  In shooting, the shotgun competitions (Clay pigeon shooting) were relocated to Lima, Perú, because the equipment and munition did not arrive in time, and they were held until December 6, 2009, ten days after the official closing ceremony of the games.  As a consequence, criticism emerged, and restructuring of the games as well as far-reaching reforms were requested to guarantee their future.

Venues 
Sucre, Bolivia, hosted the following competitions:
athletics (Estadio Olímpico Patria), basketball (Polideportivo Garcilazo), beach volleyball (Polideportivo Garcilazo), billiards (Salón Club de la Unión), boxing (Coliseo Universitario), BMX racing (Pista de Bicicross del Complejo Deportivo Garcilazo), mountain biking (Circuito Donwhill Sagrado Corazón de Jesús), diving (piscina de la zona de El Rollo),† fencing (Polideportivo Complejo Patria), football (Estadio Patria), futsal (Complejo Deportivo Garcilazo), artistic gymnastics (Coliseo "Max Toledo"), rhythmic gymnastics (Poligimnasio Max Toledo), karate (Estadio Edgar Cojintos), racquetball (Polideportivo Complejo Patria), roller speed skating road,† roller speed skating track,† swimming (piscina de la zona de El Rollo), table tennis (Coliseo Jorge Revilla), taekwondo (Coliseo de Combates Poligimnasio Max Toledo), tennis (Complejo Deportivo La Madona), volleyball (Coliseo Jorge Revilla Aldana), water polo (piscina de la zona de El Rollo),† weightlifting (Coliseo Universitario), wrestling (Coliseo Cerrado “Edgar Cojinto”) 
†:  Event initially scheduled, but cancelled at short notice.

Cochabamba, Bolivia:
baseball (Estadio de Laguna Alalay), track cycling (Velódromo “Mariscal Santa Cruz”), road cycling, equestrianism (Country Club Cochabamba)

Santa Cruz, Bolivia:
bowling (Bolera: Cosmic Bowling), shooting (Polígono de Villa Victoria “Abraham Telchi”)

Tarija, Bolivia:
canoeing (el embalse de San Jacinto), triathlon (Represa de San Jacinto)

Guayaquil, Ecuador:
softball (Estadio Liga del Sur), water skiing (Samborondón Mocoli Island)† 
†:  Event initially scheduled, but cancelled at short notice.

Quito, Ecuador:
archery (Estadio de la Universidad Politécnica), squash (Concentración Deportiva de Pichinca)

Salinas, Ecuador:
sailing (Salinas Yacht Club), surfing

Lima, La Punta, Perú:
badminton (Club Regatas), judo (Coliseo de Basquetbol del Club Regatas Lima de Chorrillos), rowing (Yacht Club de la Punta), clay pigeon shooting (Polígono Quiñónez de la Base Aérea de Las Palmas)

Participation 
About 2377 athletes from 6 countries were reported to participate:

  (493)
 (520)
 (438)
 (94)
 (277)
 (555)

Sports
In March 2009, three disciplines were already cancelled because the required
minimum number of member federations was not reached, namely women's futsal,
artistic roller skating, and waterskiing.  Moreover, 91 events in 11 sports were cancelled at short notice,<ref
name=eluniverso_01/> among them completely the diving, water polo, and roller speed skating competitions.

The following 30 sports were explicitly mentioned:

Aquatic sports 
 Swimming
 Archery 
 Athletics
 Baseball
 Basketball
 Billiards
 Bowling
 Boxing
 Canoeing
Cycling 
 BMX racing
 Mountain biking
 Road cycling
 Track cycling
 Equestrian
 Fencing
Football 
 Football‡
 Futsal
Gymnastics 
 Artistic gymnastics
 Rhythmic gymnastics
 Judo
 Karate
 Racquetball
 Rowing
 Sailing
 Shooting
 Softball
 Squash
 Surfing 
 Table tennis
 Taekwondo
 Tennis
 Triathlon
Volleyball 
 Beach volleyball
 Volleyball
 Weightlifting
 Wrestling

‡: The competition was reserved to youth representatives (U-17).

Medal count
The medal count for these Games is tabulated below. This table is sorted by the number of gold medals earned by each country.  The number of silver medals is taken into consideration next, and then the number of bronze medals.

External links
Official website  
Coverage of the Games by the Venezuelan Sports ministry (Ministerio del Poder Popular Para el Deporte)

References 

 
Bolivarian Games
B
Bolivarian Games
B
Bolivar
Multi-sport events in Bolivia
Chuquisaca Department
Sports competitions in Santa Cruz de la Sierra
Sports competitions in Sucre
History of Santa Cruz de la Sierra
History of Sucre
November 2009 sports events in South America